The Pensacola Naval Air Station Historic District encompasses the early historic elements of Naval Air Station Pensacola in Warrington, Florida.  Included in the historic district are surviving buildings of the Pensacola Navy Yard, which the air station took over, as well as buildings related to the early years of aviator training by the United States Navy.  The district, roughly bounded by West Street, Saufley Avenue, and Pensacola Bay, was designated a U.S. National Historic Landmark District in 1976.

Description and history
The Pensacola Naval Air Station Historic District is located at the southeastern corner of the modern Naval Air Station Pensacola. The district includes buildings dating to the post-Civil War period of the navy yard, as well as early structures related to the training of naval aviators on seaplanes. The original navy yard commander's house is in the district, as are residential barracks, an 1865 chapel, and a variety of service buildings that have seen different uses throughout their history. When listed as a National Historic Landmark, there were 55 buildings in all.

Pensacola Navy Yard was established in the 1820s, not long after Florida became a territory of the United States.  Most of its facilities were destroyed in 1862 by Confederate forces in the American Civil War, but Union forces soon began to rebuild it.  The yard suffered major damage during a hurricane in 1906, after which there was another major building program.  In 1913, Pensacola was chosen as the site of the Navy's formal training program for sea-based aviators, resulting in the construction of facilities specific to that use.  Most significant among these are a series of seaplane hangars, located along the southernmost shore of the facility.

See also
List of National Historic Landmarks in Florida
National Register of Historic Places listings in Escambia County, Florida

References

External links

Escambia County markers at Florida's Office of Cultural and Historical Programs
, and many other entries for other structures

National Register of Historic Places in Escambia County, Florida
National Historic Landmarks in Florida
Historic districts on the National Register of Historic Places in Florida
Historic American Buildings Survey in Florida